Enzo Cardozo Jimenez is the Paraguayan Minister of Agriculture and Livestock under President Fernando Lugo.

References

Living people
Government ministers of Paraguay
Year of birth missing (living people)
Place of birth missing (living people)